"Caracara" is the second solo single by South African recording artist K.O, featuring Kid X, released by Cashtime Life on 3 March 2014. It was released on various digital platforms. A major crossover hit, "Caracara" peaked at number 6 on South Africa's official music chart. It was the first South African music video to surpass 1 million views on YouTube.

Production was handled by Lunatik, who also produced Kid X's debut single "Pass n Special". The music video for "Caracara" was released via YouTube on 25 April 2014.

Accolades

Channel O Africa Music Video Awards

!Ref
|-
|rowspan="5"|2014
|rowspan="5"|"Caracara"
|Most Gifted Male
|
|
|-
|Most Gifted Duo/Group or Featuring Artist
|
|
|-
|Most Gifted Hip Hop
|
|
|-
|Most Gifted Southern Artist
|
|
|-
|Most Gifted Video of the Year
|
|
|-

Composition and meaning
"Caracara" marks the departure of K.O from his previous sound with Teargas. The majority of the song's chorus heavily interpolates "Bengimngaka" by Kwaito group Trompies. The song explores a new subgenre of hip hop known as Skhanda rap which fuses elements of Kwaito and rap music.

"Caracara" is a South African term for the Volkswagen Microbus, considered a popular vehicle in South African townships during the 90's. During the second part of the chorus, which is in Zulu, K.O recites "Ngiblome neziphalaphala, phakathi kwe caracara", which, when loosely translated, means, "I'm hanging around beautiful women, sitting inside a microbus".

Reception
The song's general reception was positive, earning K.O 5 nominations at the 2014 Channel O Music Video Awards.

Music video
In April 2014, its music video was released on YouTube. It features K.O and Kid X dressed in pantsula attire as well as cameo appearances by AKA, Cashtime Life and its affiliates.

The video also features numerous scenes showing Caravelles cruising through the township.

"Caracara" became the first South African music video to surpass 1 million views, achieving this 7 months after its release, and has garnered over 3 million views on YouTube.

Charts

Weekly charts

References

External links

2014 singles
South African songs
2014 songs